Caulerpa subserrata is a species of seaweed in the Caulerpaceae family.

Description
The seaweed has erect fronds that arise from repeating, cylindrically shaped, branching, glabrous surculus and often two or three individuals are found together. It is flat and has a linear or elliptic to oblong shape in outline. The fronds are truncato-obtuse at apex and oval at the base tapering to a very short cylindrical stipe. It can be simple or branches by proliferations and is serrated with lobes along both margins. The lobes are short, patent and a little curved upward and subalternate.

Taxonomy
The species was first formally described by the botanist Kintarô Okamura in 1897 as part of the work On the algae from Ogasawara-jima (Bonin Islands) as published in the Botanical Magazine, Tokyo.

Distribution

References

subserrata
Species described in 1897